Malvern is a village in the Santa Cruz Mountains in Jamaica's St. Elizabeth parish.

It is the site of Bethlehem Moravian College, Munro College (151-year-old boys' secondary school) and Hampton School (a high school for girls) which is just as old.

References 

Populated places in Saint Elizabeth Parish